Wang Xiaojun (born September 1952) is a lieutenant general of the People's Liberation Army (PLA) of China. He has been deputy commander of the Guangzhou Military Region since July 2014, and formerly served as commander of the PLA Hong Kong Garrison and the Hainan Military District.

Biography
Wang Xiaojun was born in September 1952 in Guantao, Hebei province. He joined the PLA in December 1969, and the Communist Party of China in November 1970. He graduated from the Central Party School with a bachelor's degree. He also studied at the PLA National Defence University from 1997 to 1998.

He served as deputy commander of the PLA Hong Kong Garrison from 1999 to 2004, commander of the Hainan Military District from 2004 to 2012. He was also a member of the Hainan Provincial Party Standing Committee from 2007 to 2012. In October 2012 he was appointed commander of the PLA Hong Kong Garrison, replacing Zhang Shibo. In July 2014 he became deputy commander of the Guangzhou Military Region, and Lieutenant General Tan Benhong succeeded him as commander of the Hong Kong Garrison.

Wang attained the rank of major general in 1998, and lieutenant general (zhongjiang) in 2012.

References

1952 births
Living people
People's Liberation Army generals from Hebei
People from Handan
PLA National Defence University alumni
Deputy commanders of the Guangzhou Military Region
Commanders of the People's Liberation Army Hong Kong garrison
Commanders of the Hainan Military District
Deputy commanders of the Shenyang Military Region